The 1971–72 Football League Cup was the 12th season of the Football League Cup, a knock-out competition for England's top 92 football clubs. The tournament started on 17 August 1971 and ended with the final at Wembley on 4 March 1972.
Stoke City won the tournament after defeating Chelsea in the final at Wembley Stadium, London.
Entry for all football league clubs became compulsory this season.

Calendar
Of the 92 teams, 36 received a bye to the second round (teams ranked 1st–36th in the 1970–71 Football League) and the other 56 played in the first round. Semi-finals were two-legged.

First round

Ties

Replays

2nd Replays

Second round

Ties

Replays

Third round

Ties

Replays

Fourth round

Ties

Replays

2nd Replay

Fifth Round

Ties

Semi-finals

First Leg

Second Leg

Replay

2nd Replay

Final

The final was held at Wembley Stadium, London on 4 March 1972.

References

General

Specific

1971–72
1971–72 domestic association football cups
Lea
Cup